Horst Dieter Engelke is a former West German slalom canoeist who competed in the 1960s. He won a gold medal in the K-1 team event at the 1965 ICF Canoe Slalom World Championships in Spittal.

References

Possibly living people
German male canoeists
Year of birth missing
Medalists at the ICF Canoe Slalom World Championships